James Andrew Mankey (born May 23, 1952 in Washington) is an American rock guitarist, most widely known as the co-founder and longtime guitarist of the band Concrete Blonde. Mankey was also the bassist with the band Sparks for their first two albums.

He is the brother of musician and record producer Earle Mankey.

In 2003, Mankey released J.A.M., a solo instrumental album.

References

External links
Official Concrete Blonde website

1952 births
Living people
American rock guitarists
Sparks (band) members
Concrete Blonde members